Holiday Airlines was an intrastate airline in the United States. Holiday operated scheduled passenger service with Lockheed L-188 Electra turboprops in California primarily serving Lake Tahoe Airport from both the Los Angeles-Burbank-Long Beach-San Diego area in southern California and the San Francisco Bay Area in northern California during the 1960s and 1970s.  The company slogans were Fastest Fun in the West and The Great Chair Lift.

The Holiday Airlines name was also used by a commuter air carrier in the northeast U.S. during the 1980s which operated small Beechcraft 1900 and de Havilland Canada DHC-6 Twin Otter turboprop aircraft and used the two letter "JO" IATA airline code.

Fleet
The Holiday Airlines fleet in California consisted of the following aircraft:

 3 Lockheed L-188 Electra

Destinations

The airline served the following destinations in California during its existence:

Burbank (BUR)
Lake Tahoe (TVL) - focus destination
Long Beach (LGB)
Los Angeles (LAX)
Oakland (OAK)
San Diego (SAN)
San Jose (SJC)

See also 
 List of defunct airlines of the United States

References

Defunct regional airlines of the United States
Defunct organizations based in California
Companies with year of disestablishment missing
20th-century establishments in the United States
Airlines based in California
Defunct airlines of the United States